Awudu Abass Abass (born 27 January 1993) is a naturalized Italian professional basketball player for Virtus Bologna of the Italian Lega Basket Serie A (LBA) and the EuroLeague.

Professional career
Abass joined local club Pallacanestro Cantù as a teenager, progressing quickly through the youth ranks to make his debut in 2011 aged only 18. He was too young to make an immediate impact, playing sparingly in his first three seasons, he did however grab minutes, and rebounds, in Europe's top-tier level EuroLeague, playing in two games, one against powerhouse Real Madrid.

The 2013–14 proved to be his breakthrough season, he earned regular minutes in the LBA and European second tier EuroCup, as a youth product he became a fan favourite and was awarded the captaincy the next season, becoming the youngest captain of Cantù's history.

On 19 July 2018, Abass signed a two-year deal with Basket Brescia Leonessa.

After two important seasons with Brescia, during which he became one of the most prominent Italian players of the league, in June 2020, he signed with Virtus Bologna. After having knocked out 3–0 both Basket Treviso in the quarterfinals and New Basket Brindisi in the semifinals, on 11 June 2021 Virtus defeated 4–0 its historic rival Olimpia Milano in the national finals, winning its 16th national title and the first one after twenty years. On 21 September, the team won its second Supercup, defeating Olimpia Milano 90–84. Moreover, after having ousted Lietkabelis, Ulm and Valencia in the first three rounds of the playoffs, on 11 May 2022, Virtus defeated Frutti Extra Bursaspor by 80–67 at the Segafredo Arena, winning its first EuroCup and qualifying for the EuroLeague after 14 years. However, despite having ended the regular season at the first place and having ousted 3–0 both Pesaro and Tortona in the first two rounds of playoffs, Virtus was defeated 4–2 in the national finals by Olimpia Milan. On 29 September 2022, after having ousted Olimpia Milano in the semifinals, Virtus won its third Supercup, defeating 72–69 Banco di Sardegna Sassari and achieving a back-to-back, following the 2021 trophy. However, Abass did not play due to an injury.

National team career
Abass was called up soon after officially becoming Italian, joining the Under-20 side of the Italian national basketball team that won gold at the 2013 FIBA Europe Under-20 Championship, where he was part of the All Tournament Team.
He represented the Italian National Basketball team at the  2019 FIBA Basketball World Cup in China, where he averaged  8 points, 3 rebounds and 0.3 assists.

Personal life
Awudu Abass Abass father is originally from Ghana whilst his mother is from Nigeria (not Togo as erroneously reported by some sources), they met in Rome where they married before moving to Como where Awudu was born. He obtained Italian citizenship as soon as he could, at the age of 18, having to wait that long as he was born to foreign nationals.

Abass still lived in Como, in 2012, at only 19, he was a candidate for the municipal elections as second on the Amo la Mia Città list, however it obtained only one seat so he was not elected.

References

External links

EuroLeague.net profile
Eurobasket.com profile
RealGM.com profile

1993 births
Living people
2019 FIBA Basketball World Cup players
Basket Brescia Leonessa players
Italian men's basketball players
Italian people of Ghanaian descent
Italian people of Nigerian descent
Italian sportspeople of African descent
Lega Basket Serie A players
Olimpia Milano players
Pallacanestro Cantù players
Small forwards
Sportspeople from Como
Virtus Bologna players